Elk Creek is a stream in Nobles and Rock counties, in the U.S. state of Minnesota. It is a tributary of the Rock River.

Elk Creek was named for the fact elk were once frequently seen there.

See also
List of rivers of Minnesota

References

Rivers of Nobles County, Minnesota
Rivers of Rock County, Minnesota
Rivers of Minnesota